Fool's Fate is a fantasy novel by American writer Robin Hobb, the third in her Tawny Man Trilogy. It was published in 2003.

Plot summary

Once assassin to the king, Fitz is now Skillmaster to Prince Dutiful's small band, sailing towards the distant Out Island of Aslevjal. His duty is to help the Prince fulfil the Narcheska Elliania's challenge: Bring her the head of the dragon, Icefyre, whom legends say is buried deep beneath the ice. Only after this task is complete will they be married and bring an end to war between their kingdoms.

It is not a happy ship: the serving boy, Thick, is constantly ill/sea-sick, and his powerful telepathic abilities cause many on the ship to likewise be ill. Fitz tries to calm Thick, but in the end, it is Nettle who is able to do so. Nettle is able to Skill into other people's dreams. She also forms a connection with the female dragon. 
Fitz, his Skill-dreams plagued by a female dragon, is unhappy at leaving the Fool behind but is determined to keep the White Prophet from his fate, death. Chade's fascination with the Skill is growing to the point of obsession.

Few on the Out Islands welcome the idea of a foreign prince slaying the Aslevjal legend. When the prince's party arrive at the first of Outislands, they stay at the Narcheska's father's stronghouse, the Boar Clan. Fitz and Chade quickly learn that they are not welcome. the Hetguard oppose the Prince's quest and think it was wrong of the Narcheska to offer it. After understanding that the best course of action is to let the Hetguard decide for themselves what needs to be done, the prince and his closer court travel to the Narcheska's motherhouse, while the other nobles remain to form trade deals. Fitz tries to trick Thick into boarding the ship that will take them to their next stop, but Thick lashes out at him. In the end Web is able to coax Thick aboard. While trying to calm Thick within his dreams, Fitz reveals Nettle to Dutiful, who demands to understand her story and in the end, that she be taken to stay with the Queen and be kept safe. Fitz fears the dragon will harm Nettle, and agrees. Nettle is furious with him and refuses to speak to him, though she continues to speak to Thick.

At the Narwhale motherhouse, Dutiful and Elliania are formally betrothed. On condition that Dutiful will slay the dragon. It becomes obvious that others want Elliania's position, that something is amiss concerning her mother (who is not there) and that she and her uncle are concealing something from Dutiful concerning the dragon. In addition, Fitz and Chade learn that there is a certain Black Man involved with the dragon and that in order to reach the dragon, something must be done about him.

A small party finally arrives on the frozen island where the dragon is, greeted by the Fool, who has flown there with the help of a stone dragon he previously rode. His intentions are at odds with Chade, who is determined to slay the dragon to secure peace, whatever the cost. It turns out that the Fool has flown to the island on Girl on a Dragon. 
The party on the island are split: Web and the wit coterie are opposed to killing the dragon. Swift, Burrich and Molly's son, is part of it and is torn between his loyalty to the prince and his loyalty to the coterie. The Hetguard are, of course, opposed to slaying the dragon. Paeotter gives Fitz "courage cake" that steals his ability to Skill. Fitz is able to keep Thick and the others from eating it too. 
The band on the island begin digging down to the dragon. Riddle and Hest are sent back to camp to bring supplies and never return. Thick behaves strangely the closer they dig to the dragon and Chade decides to send Fitz, the Fool and Thick back to camp to find out what happened to Riddle and Hest and bring supplies. On the way, Fitz and the Fool fall into a snow chasm and arrive at the realm of the Pale Woman.
She is building her own dragon by Forging captives into it. Kebal Rawbread is mostly Forged as well and is with her.
The Pale Woman tries to get Fitz to switch to her side and become her Catalyst. He refuses and attacks her. She then has the Fool chained with the rest of her captives and will Forge him as well unless Fitz will kill the dragon. The Fool reveals that Elliania's mother and sister have been Forged and are with the Pale Woman. They are the reason that Elliania wants Dutiful to kill the dragon. If he kills the dragon, the Pale Woman will kill her mother and sister, and save them from their Forged state. 
Fitz promises to kill the dragon and is thrown out of the Pale Woman's realm. He finds his way back to camp with the help of the Black Man. Burrich is there and he heals Fitz (whose shoulder has been dislocated by the Pale Woman's guards). Fitz informs Chade and Dutiful of everything he has learned. They confront Elliania and her uncle who tell them the entire story: for years the Pale Woman has been stealing their young men and boys and Forging them. She also had Elliania tattooed with the dragon and serpent and this is how she is able to control the Narcheska and her family. Henja has been the Pale Woman's agent. The Pale Woman tried to get the Piebalds to deliver Fitz and the Fool to her, but her plan failed. She also offered Elliania and her uncle to deliver Fitz and the Fool to her in exchange for the bodies of the Narcheska's mother and sister. It is imperative that they be buried near their motherhouse. 
Fitz convinces everyone that they will use Chade's explosives to blow up the ice around the dragon and then kill it. Dutiful goes with him. As they set up the explosives, Fitz sends Dutiful back to be with Burrich and then is suddenly in contact with Icefire and learns his story. He understands that he should not kill the dragon, even if this means the Fool will die.
The entire party, not including Elliania and Peottre, band together to free the dragon with the help of Chade's explosives. While putting the explosives together, Fitz and Burrich talk about the past, including Burrich's use of the wit. Tintaglia understands they are freeing him but also thinks they will harm him and threatens them. Once they free Icefire, the Pale Woman unleashes her own dragon, made of memory stone and embodying Kebal Rawbread. At the same time, Elliania and Peottre free her mother and sister, who are forged and nearly dead. The dragon attacks Icefire and Tintaglia, wounding her. Burrich tries to help her and Swift protects them from the Rawbread dragon's attack. Burrich is gravely hurt. Swift shoots the dragon in the eye with an arrow and kills him. All of the emotions poured into him are released and the Forged Outislanders return to themselves, including Elliania's mother and sister. Icefire and Tintaglia unite. 
Fitz gathers the coterie to try to heal Burrich but they are unable to due to his being sealed off to the skill. Instead, Thick is able to heal other members of the party injured in the fight. Finally, Fitz is able to remove Elliania's tattoo. 
Fitz goes back to the Pale Woman's realm to find the Fool. Peottre tells him the Fool is dead, but Fitz goes anyway. Fitz finds the fool dead in the Pale Woman's realm. He also finds the Pale woman who has not died and tries to get Fitz to kill her. She has been deformed since Kebal Rawbread tried to take her with him into the dragon. Fitz concentrates on saving the Fool's body. He finds a room with a map of the Skill Stones and then Skill Stones and takes himself and the Fool to the stone quarry where the Elderling dragons sleep. He is able to bring the Fool back from the dead.
They then return to the Black Man and Thick. 
The Fool and the Black Man turn out to be from the same school. The Black Man is also a White and he explains how he tried to deal with the Pale Woman. The Fool tells Fitz he is going back to his school with the Black Man, although Fitz wants to bring him back to Buckkeep. In the end, Fitz and Thick go back through the memory stones. He meets Patience and Lacey by accident and Lacey recognizes him. Fitz then returns to the Black Man's cave. The Fool removes their Skill bond and it is supposed to be their final parting. Fitz gathers two sacks of Skill writings to return to Chade. He and the Black Man find the Pale Woman who is dead. Fitz returns through the Skill stones but turns out he was lost within them for a month. In the month he was gone, the Fool came to Buckkeep, and was surprised Fitz was not there. He left a gift for him. 
Fitz arrived in time for Harvestfest and Elliania arrives unannounced to marry Dutiful. 
Fitz meets Molly and they begin to patch things between them slowly.
After much back and forth, Molly and Fitz marry. They move to Withywoods, which Patience has given to Molly in recognition of Burrich's service with understanding it will pass to Nettle, as Chivalry's granddaughter.

Editions
This edition's cover is illustrated by John Howe.

References

 

2003 American novels
American fantasy novels
Novels by Robin Hobb
HarperCollins books